"Rapid Hope Loss" is a song by Dashboard Confessional, released in 2004. "Rapid Hope Loss" was released to radio on December 9, 2003. It peaked at No. 75 in the UK and at No. 37 on the U.S. Alternative Airplay chart in the United States.

Track listing
 "Rapid Hope Loss" (album version) – 3:42
 "Hold On" – 2:08
 "This Is a Forgery" – 3:37

Chart performance

References

2004 songs
Dashboard Confessional songs
Songs written by Chris Carrabba